The Outlaws Is Coming (stylized as The Outlaws IS Coming!) is the sixth and final theatrical comedy starring The Three Stooges after their 1959 resurgence in popularity. By this time, the trio consisted of Moe Howard, Larry Fine, and Joe DeRita (dubbed "Curly Joe"). Like its predecessor, The Three Stooges Go Around the World in a Daze, the film was co-written, produced and directed by Moe's son-in-law, Norman Maurer. The supporting cast features Adam West, Nancy Kovack, and Emil Sitka, the latter in three roles.

Title Sequence

A gunslinger comes into a saloon. The title appears hovering in the air and the man shoots out each letter. The cast is then written on various pieces of glassware which the gunslinger shoots out one by one.

Plot
In 1871, Rance Roden (Don Lamond) in the town of Casper, Wyoming, plans to kill off all the buffalo and thus cause the Indians to riot. After they destroy the U.S. Cavalry (his real enemy), Rance and his gang will take over the West.

Meanwhile, a Boston magazine gets wind of the buffalo slaughter and sends assistant editor Kenneth Cabot (Adam West) to investigate. The decision is timed with Moe, Larry and Curly Joe coming to his photographic studio to photograph his skunk. Once in Casper, Ken's shooting skills—secretly aided by sharp shooter Annie Oakley (Nancy Kovack)—earn him the job of town sheriff. Rance has his band of bad guys called in to have the lawmen wiped out, but the Stooges sneak into the gang's hideout while the gang is asleep and glue their firearms to their holsters. When Ken confronts the bad guys, the bad guys decide that a life of justice is better than crime. Meanwhile, Rance and Trigger attempt to sell firearms to the Indians, including an armored wagon containing a Gatling Gun and cannon in a turret, but the Stooges foil this plan by snapping a picture of them making the sale.

After proving his bravery in other ways Cabot ends up marrying Annie Oakley.

Production notes
Upon release of The Outlaws IS Coming, a number of English teachers expressed displeasure over the movie's grammatically incorrect title. The title itself was a satire of Alfred Hitchcock's 1963 film The Birds, which featured the tagline "The Birds is Coming". The film satirises many 1960's fads, films and television commercials as well as the Western.

In a nod to television's key role in the resurgence of the Stooges' popularity, the outlaw characters featured in the film were played by local TV hosts from across the U.S. whose shows featured the trio's old Columbia shorts.

On A&E's Biography, Adam West spoke about his involvement with the film and with the Stooges:

Primary cast and crew
Moe Howard as Moe
Larry Fine as Larry
Joe DeRita as Curly-Joe
Adam West as Kenneth Cabot
Nancy Kovack as Annie Oakley
Mort Mills as Trigger Mortis
Don Lamond as Rance Roden
Rex Holman as Sunstroke Kid
Emil Sitka as Mr. Abernathy/Medicine man/Cavalry colonel
Henry Gibson as Charlie Horse
Murray Alper as Chief Crazy Horse
Tiny Brauer as Bartender

The Outlaws
Joe Bolton as Rob Dalton
Bill Camfield as Wyatt Earp
Hal Fryar as Johnny Ringo
Johnny Ginger as Billy the Kid
Wayne Mack as Jesse James
Ed T. McDonnell as Bat Masterson
Bruce Sedley as Cole Younger
Paul Shannon as Wild Bill Hickok
Sally Starr as Belle Starr

See also
List of American films of 1965

References

External links 
 
 
 
 The Outlaws IS Coming! at threestooges.net
 On the Set of The Outlaws Is Coming (1965), The Bill Camfield Collection, Texas Archive of the Moving Image.

1965 films
American Western (genre) comedy films
Films set in 1871
Columbia Pictures films
The Three Stooges films
1960s English-language films
American black-and-white films
Films scored by Paul Dunlap
Cultural depictions of Annie Oakley
Cultural depictions of Crazy Horse
Cultural depictions of Wyatt Earp
Cultural depictions of Billy the Kid
Cultural depictions of Jesse James
Cultural depictions of Belle Starr
Cultural depictions of Bat Masterson
Cultural depictions of Wild Bill Hickok
Cultural depictions of Johnny Ringo
1960s Western (genre) comedy films
1965 comedy films
Films set in Wyoming
Films shot in Wyoming
Films directed by Norman Maurer
1960s American films